The 2018 U Sports Women's Volleyball Championship was held March 16–18, 2018, in Quebec City, Quebec, to determine a national champion for the 2017–18 U Sports women's volleyball season. The tournament was played at PEPS gymnase at Université Laval. It was the seventh time that Laval had hosted the tournament with the most recent occurring in 2011.

The OUA Champion Ryerson Rams completed a perfect season, finishing with a 19–0 regular season record, 3–0 OUA playoff record, and 3–0 U Sports championship record to claim the first national championship in program history and in school history.

Participating teams

Championship bracket

Consolation bracket

References

External links 
 Tournament Web Site

U Sports volleyball
2018 in women's volleyball
Université Laval